Uprising is a young-adult novel by Margaret Peterson Haddix and published by Simon & Schuster in September 2007. The novel is a fictionalized account of the Triangle Shirtwaist Factory fire. According to Maureen Paschal of The Washington Post, it "helps reinforce how immigrants have often struggled with hardship and unfairness".

Summary
Bella, newly arrived in New York City from Calia, Italy, starts work at the Triangle Shirtwaist Factory. There, along with 500 other immigrants, she works long hours at a grueling job under terrible conditions. Yetta, a coworker from Russia, has been crusading for a trade union. When factory conditions worsen, workers rise up in a strike. Jane, a runaway daughter of a wealthy businessman, who later works as a governess for Mr. Blanck (one of the owners), learns of the workers and becomes involved with their cause. 

Bella and Yetta are at work and Jane is visiting the factory on March 25, 1911, when a spark ignites piles of cloth, leading to one of the worst workplace disasters in history, the Triangle Shirtwaist Factory fire. In the end, only Bella survives, by going onto the roof and climbing to a nearby building and out their exit. Bella tells her story to her two daughters, Yetta and Jane.

Awards
 Ohioana Book Award for Juvenile Literature
 New York Public Library Book for the Teen Age
 International IMPAC Dublin Literary Award nominee

See also

References

2007 American novels
Novels by Margaret Peterson Haddix
Fiction set in 1911
Novels set in New York City
Triangle Shirtwaist Factory fire